USD 268 is a public unified school district headquartered in Cheney, Kansas, United States.  The district includes the communities of Cheney, Mount Vernon, and nearby rural areas.

Schools
The school district operates the following schools:
 Cheney High School
 Cheney Middle School
 Cheney Elementary

There are approximately 240 students in grades 9-12. The Middle School houses grades six through eight with a population of just under 200 students.
Fall sports include cross country, football, girls' golf, and volleyball, winter sports include bowling, basketball and wrestling. In the spring students play baseball, softball, track and field, the boys also golf.

See also
 Kansas State Department of Education
 Kansas State High School Activities Association
 List of high schools in Kansas
 List of unified school districts in Kansas

References

External links
 

School districts in Kansas
Education in Sedgwick County, Kansas